Together Forever – A Pixar Nighttime Spectacular was a multimedia nighttime show at Disneyland that premiered alongside the returning Paint the Night parade on April 13, 2018 as part of the Pixar Fest celebration. The show used fireworks, projection mapping, fire, lasers and searchlights to tell stories of friendship from various Pixar films.

Similar in scale to Disneyland Forever, there were several different viewing locations for the show. Projection mapping was used on Sleeping Beauty Castle, It's a Small World, and the buildings of Main Street, USA. The show was also projected onto the water screens on the Rivers of America (used during Fantasmic!).

This was the first fireworks show to use Disneyland Forever's storyline, which uses Disney Dreams storyline. A similar storyline was also used for the Once Upon a Time fireworks show.

Show summary
The show begins with the Luxo Ball from Luxo Jr. rolling towards the audience via projections. Buzz Lightyear from Toy Story appears, flying over Sleeping Beauty Castle as fireworks and searchlights illuminate the sky.

Dug from Up gets distracted by a squirrel as characters from Monsters, Inc. and Monsters University take over. A projected ocean sets the scene for Finding Nemo as Marlin and Dory bicker. Next, Joy and Sadness from Inside Out traverse through Riley's mind, eventually discovering Bing Bong. Russell begins a rehearsed speech to Carl Fredericksen, who promptly shuts the door to end the section.

WALL-E and Eve from WALL-E are projected onto landmarks throughout the park while flying across outer space to the film's score. Then, Miguel from Coco strums his guitar and breaks into song as inflatable skeletons appear above buildings on Main Street, USA.

"Life is a Highway" from Cars plays as several characters from the franchise make an appearances. Suddenly, The Incredibles take over in a battle to defeat the Omni droid. Fire shoots around Sleeping Beauty Castle synchronized with the incinerator from Toy Story 3 until the toys are ultimately saved by "The Claw".

After projecting clips from Up, Carl Fredrickson's house flies above Sleeping Beauty Castle. Finally, a montage of several "friendship moments" from various Pixar films are projected to the song "You've Got a Friend in Me." Buzz Lightyear and Woody appear once again, proclaiming that their friendship is "to infinity and beyond" as the show concludes. 

After the show, park guests see footage of Barbie from the credits of Toy Story 2 thanking the audience for coming, as the song "We Belong Together" plays as exit music. On some occasions (such as the 4th of July) this has been replaced with a holiday-related ending, though Tour Guide Barbie can still be heard giving her spiel.

See also
Happily Ever After
Disney Illuminations
Celebrate the Magic
Once Upon a Time
Ignite the Dream: A Nighttime Spectacular of Magic and Light
Disneyland Forever

References

External links

Disneyland
Walt Disney Parks and Resorts fireworks